Christopher Klotz (born May 22, 1984 in Laguna Niguel, California) is a retired American soccer player.

Career

College
Klotz played club soccer for the Irvine Strikers and played four years of college soccer at the University of California, Irvine from 2002 to 2005, where he earned All Big West and Scholar Athlete Honors. During his college years he also played in the USL Premier Development League with the Southern California Seahorses.

Professional
Undrafted out of college, Klotz signed with the Charlotte Eagles in the USL Second Division in 2006. He made his professional debut on May 20, 2006, in a game against Wilmington Hammerheads. Klotz remained a player for Charlotte through the 2010 season. During his playing career, Klotz was also an assistant director for the Charlotte Eagles camp program, Learn from the Pros, where he helped with the program curriculum and staff training. After retiring as an active player, Klotz stayed with Charlotte as part of its youth development team.

References

External links
 Charlotte Eagles bio

1984 births
Living people
American soccer players
Charlotte Eagles players
Southern California Seahorses players
USL Second Division players
UC Irvine Anteaters men's soccer players
USL League Two players
Soccer players from California
People from Laguna Niguel, California
Association football midfielders